Miguel Angel Lemus Ochoa (born 26 October 1993) is a Salvadoran professional footballer.

Club career

FAS
In December 2013, Lemus signed with FAS.

Loan to Chalatenango
Lemus signed with Chalatenango for the Clausura 2016.

Luis Ángel Firpo
Lemus signed with Luis Ángel Firpo for the Clausura 2017.

Águila
In January 2018, Lemus signed with Águila for the Clausura 2018.

Return to Chalatenango
In December 2018, Lemus signed again with Chalatenango for the Clausura 2019 tournament.

References

1993 births
Living people
Salvadoran footballers
El Salvador international footballers
Association football defenders
C.D. FAS footballers
C.D. Luis Ángel Firpo footballers
C.D. Águila footballers
Central American Games bronze medalists for El Salvador
Central American Games medalists in football